Yvonne Sandberg-Fries (14 October 1950 – 20 December 2020) was a Swedish politician. She was a member of the Swedish Social Democratic Party until 2014, when she joined the Green Party. She served in the Riksdag from 1982 to 1996 and in the European Parliament from 2003 to 2004.

References

1950 births
2020 deaths
20th-century Swedish politicians
21st-century Swedish politicians
Members of the Riksdag from the Social Democrats
MEPs for Sweden 1999–2004
People from Umeå